International Combustion Limited was a major engineering business based in Derby offering products for the nuclear engineering industry. International Combustion Australia Limited was a separate non-affiliated company.

History
The Company was founded by W. R. Wood, an American, in 1898 in London as the Automatic Furnance Syndicate. It changed its name to the Underfeed Stoker Company in 1902 and then to International Combustion Engineering when it moved to Derby in 1922. At that time it concentrated on the production of castings from its new foundry.

By 1959 it had expanded its activities such that it was awarded the contract to provide the boilers for Trawsfynydd nuclear power station. It was acquired by Clarke Chapman in 1974 and then absorbed into Northern Engineering Industries ('NEI') in 1977; in 1989 NEI was itself acquired by Rolls-Royce plc and they decided to pass on International Combustion to ABB Group in 1997.

References

External links
 Grace's guide

Engineering companies of the United Kingdom
Manufacturing companies established in 1898
Companies based in Derby
1898 establishments in England
Manufacturing companies disestablished in 1997
1997 disestablishments in England